Conor Johnston (born 1994) is an Irish hurler who plays for Antrim Senior Championship club St. John's and at inter-county level with the Antrim senior hurling team. He usually lines out as a forward.

Career

A member of the St. John's club in Belfast, Johnston first came to prominence on the inter-county scene as a member of the Antrim minor team. He captained the team to the Ulster Minor Championship title in 2011, before later claiming Ulster Under-21 Championship success. Johnston was drafted onto the Antrim senior hurling team straight out of the minor grade. Since then he has won two Ulster Championship titles, a National League Division 2A title and a Joe McDonagh Cup title.

Honours

Antrim
Ulster Senior Hurling Championship: 2013, 2017
Joe McDonagh Cup: 2020
National Hurling League Division 2A: 2017
Ulster Under-21 Hurling Championship: 2015
Ulster Minor Hurling Championship: 2011

References

External links
Conor Johnston profile at the Antrim GAA website

1994 births
Living people
Antrim inter-county hurlers